Traité élémentaire de chimie (Elementary Treatise on Chemistry) is a textbook written by Antoine Lavoisier published in 1789 and translated into English by Robert Kerr in 1790 under the title Elements of Chemistry in a New Systematic Order containing All the Modern Discoveries. It is considered to be the first modern chemical textbook.

The book defines an element as a single substance that can't be broken down by chemical analysis and from which all chemical compounds are formed, publishing his discovery that fermentation produces carbon dioxide (carbonic gas) and spirit of wine, saying that it is "more appropriately called by the Arabic word alcohol since it is formed from cider or fermented sugar as well as wine", and publishing the first chemical equation "grape must = carbonic acid + alcohol", calling this reaction "one of the most extraordinary in chemistry", noting "In these experiments, we have to assume that there is a true balance or equation between the elements of the compounds with which we start and those obtained at the end of the chemical reaction."

The book contains 33 elements, only 23 of which are elements in the modern sense. The elements given by Lavoisier are: light, caloric, oxygen, azote (nitrogen), hydrogen, sulphur, phosphorous (phosphorus), charcoal, muriatic radical (chloride), fluoric radical (fluoride), boracic radical, antimony, arsenic, bismuth, cobalt, copper, gold, iron, lead, manganese, mercury, molybdena (molybdenite), nickel, platina (platinum), silver, tin,  (tungsten), zinc, lime, magnesia (magnesium), barytes (baryte),  (clay or earth of alum), and silex.

The law of conservation of mass, which in France is taught as Lavoisier's Law, is paraphrased in the phrase "Rien ne se perd, rien ne se crée, tout se transforme." ("Nothing is lost, nothing is created, everything is transformed.")

See also
The Sceptical Chymist by Robert Boyle

Notes

Works cited

External links

English translation on Project Gutenberg
Internet Archive version of a 1965 reprint
Traité élémentaire de chimie from Wikimedia Commons
Title page, woodcuts, and copperplate engravings by Madame Lavoisier from a 1789 first edition of Traité élémentaire de chimie (all images freely available for download in a variety of formats from Science History Institute Digital Collections at digital.sciencehistory.org.

1789 non-fiction books
Chemistry books